In the Name Of may refer to:

 In the Name Of (record label)
 In the Name Of (film), a 2013 Polish drama film
 In the Name of..., an album by James Blood Ulmer
 "In the Name Of", a song by Babymetal from the album Metal Galaxy

See also
 "In the Name", a song by Gotthard from the album G.